Edward Carl Oliver  (May 31, 1930 – June 6, 2022) was an American politician in the state of Minnesota. He served in the Minnesota State Senate from 1993 to 2002. He was a lawyer.

Oliver was born in Saint Paul, Minnesota, and went to University of Minnesota. He served in the United States Air Force during the Korean War. Oliver was involved with the insurance business.

References

1930 births
2022 deaths
Politicians from Saint Paul, Minnesota
Businesspeople from Minnesota
Military personnel from Minnesota
University of Minnesota alumni
Republican Party Minnesota state senators